Azamora splendens is a species of snout moth in the genus Azamora. It was described by Herbert Druce in 1895 and is known from Panama.

References

Moths described in 1895
Chrysauginae
Moths of Central America